Marilyne Canto (born 18 November 1963) is a French actress and film director. She won the 2007 César Award for Best Short Film for Fais de beaux rêves.

Selected filmography

References

External links 

1963 births
Living people
French film actresses
French film directors